Crime Story may refer to:

Crime Story (1993 film), a 1993 film starring Jackie Chan
Crime Story (2021 film), a 2021 film starring Richard Dreyfuss
Crime Story (American TV series), a 1986–1988 American television series starring Dennis Farina that aired on NBC
Crime Story (British TV series), a 1992–1995 British television series that was broadcast on ITV
Crime Story (magazine), a monthly publication that brings out stories by Indra Soundar Rajan and other writers
Crime Story (novel), a 1994 novel by New Zealand author Maurice Gee

See also 
 Crime Stories (disambiguation)